Denis Kudla and Daniel Nguyen were the defending champions but chose not to defend their title.

Gerard Granollers and Marcel Granollers won the title after defeating Alejandro Gómez and Caio Silva 7–6(7–2), 6–4 in the final.

Seeds

Draw

References
 Main Draw
 Qualifying Draw

Levene Gouldin & Thompson Tennis Challenger - Doubles
2018 Doubles